Martin Livings (born 1970) is an Australian author of horror, fantasy and science fiction. He has been writing short stories since 1990 and has been nominated for both the Ditmar Award and Aurealis Award. Livings resides in Perth, Western Australia.

Livings' short fiction has appeared in the award-winning anthology Daikaiju! (Agog! Press), as well as in Borderlands, Agog! Terrific Tales (Agog! Press) and Eidolon, among many others. His work has been listed in the Year's Best Horror and Fantasy Recommended Reading, and reprinted in Year's Best Australian SF and Fantasy Volume 2 (MirrorDanse Books, 2006), Australian Dark Fantasy and Horror, 2006 Edition (Brimstone Press, 2006), and The Year's Best Australian Fantasy and Horror in 2010, 2012, 2013 and 2015 (Ticonderoga Publications).

His first novel, Carnies, was published by Lothian Books in Australia in June 2006. Carnies was nominated for an Aurealis Award and won the 2007 Tin Duck Award for Best Novel by a Western Australian.  His collection of short stories, Living With the Dead, was released in 2012 by Dark Prints Press, and an original story from the collection, "Birthday Suit", won the Australian Shadows award for Best Short Fiction that year.

Bibliography

Novels and Books
 Skinsongs, Self-published on Amazon, 2019
The Final Twist, Self-published on Amazon, 2018
Carnies, Self-published on Amazon, 2017
 Living With the Dead, Self-published on Amazon, 2017
 Rope, Self-published on Amazon, 2017
 Carnies, Cohesion Press, 2014
 Living with the Dead, Dark Prints Press, 2012
 Rope, Dark Prints Press, 2012
 Carnies, Lothian Books, 2006

Short fiction
 "Sparks", Antipodean SF, issue 250, 2019
 "El Caballo Muerte", The Year's Best Australian Fantasy and Horror 2015, 2017
 "The Circle Line", Between the Tracks, 2017
 "Tradition", Hell's Bells, 2016
 "Stillegeist", Dead of Night, 2016
 "Boxing Day", At The Edge, 2016
 "Piggies", 100 Lightnings, 2016
 "In Nomine Patris", 100 Lightnings, 2016
 "Running", The Mammoth Book of Kaiju, 2016
 "The Death of a Cruciverbalist", Smashwords on its own, or in Refuge Volume 1, 2015
 "A Red Mist", Bloodlines, 2015
 "Closer to God", Antipodean SF, issue 200, 2015
 "El Caballo Muerte", Fat Zombie, 2015
 "La Mort D’un Roturier", The Year's Best Australian Fantasy and Horror 2013, Late Nov 2014
 "Birthday Suit", Focus 2012, 2013
 "Stillegeist", Midnight Echo Issue 10, 2013
 "You Ain’t Heard Nothin' Yet", Year's Best Australian Fantasy and Horror 2012, 2013
 "In His Name", Coins of Chaos, 41548
 "La Mort d’un Roturier", This is How You Die: Machine of Death 2, 2013
 "Black Peter", Midnight Echo Issue 9, 2013
 "Cause and Effect", Next, 2013
 "Art, Ink", Antipodean SF Issue 180, 2013
 "The Ar-Dub", Living With the Dead, 2012
 "You Ain’t Heard Nothin' Yet", Living With the Dead, 2012
 "Birthday Suit", Living With the Dead, 2012
 "Trick Or…", Eclecticism Issue 17, 2012
 "Unwanted", Surviving The End, 2012
 "Home", Year's Best Fantasy & Horror Volume 1, 2011
 "The Rider", Dead Red Heart, 2011
 "The Tide" (creator and co-contributor), Dead Red Heart, 2011
 "The Last Gig of Jimmy Rucker" (with Talie Helene), More Scary Kisses, 2011
 "Blessed Are The Dead That The Rain Falls Upon", Devil Dolls and Duplicates in Australian Horror Fiction, 2011
 "Home", Scenes from the Second Storey, 2010
 "Crawling", Macabre, 2010
 "Ascension", The Year's Best Australian SF & Fantasy, Volume 5, 2010
 "Little Arkham", Worlds Next Door, 2010
 "Downtown", Eclecticism Issue 13, 2010
 "Hearts of Ice", Blade Red Dark Pages, 2010
 "The Valley", Scary Kisses, 2010
 "Lollo", Close Encounters of the Urban Kind, 2010
 "I’m Dreaming…", Festive Fear, 2009
 "Silence", Midnight Echo Issue 3, 2009
 "Zero Point", Antipodean SF, Issue 137, 40118
 "Smiley", In Bad Dreams 2: Where Death Stalks, 2009
 "Ascension", Grants Pass, 2009
 "Blessed Are The Dead That The Rain Falls Upon", New Ceres Nights, 2009
 "There Was Darkness", Australian Dark Fantasy and Horror Volume 3, 2009
 "The Velocitous and the Vexed", Hope Issue #2, 2009
 "Bedbugs", Voices, 2008
 "The Dead Priest’s Tale", Canterbury 2100, 2008
 "Piggies", Midnight Echo Issue 1, 2008
 "Catharsis", Black Box, 2007
 "3:17AM", Black Box, 2007
 "Skin Songs", 2012, 2007
 "An Evil Twin", Antipodean SF Issue 113, 2007
 "Tangled", Andromeda Spaceways Inflight Magazine Best of Horror, 2007
 "There Was Darkness", Fantastic Wonder Stories, 2007
 "Silence", Horror Day Anthology 2006, 2006
 "Hooked", Australian Dark Fantasy & Horror: 2006 edition, 2006
 "Dwar7es", Ticonderoga Online, 2006
 "The Dark Dimension", Antipodean SF issue 100, 2006
 "Running", The Year's Best Australian SF & Fantasy, Volume Two, 2006
 "Mine", The Outcast anthology, 2006
 "Killing Time", "Robots and Time" anthology, 2005
 "Playtime", Shadow Box e-anthology, Halloween 2005
 "Hell Desk", Antipodean SF Issue 85, July/August 2005
 "In Nomine Patris", Shadowed Realms issue 5, May/June 2005
 "Future Shock", Mitch? 4: Slow Dancing through Quicksand: Stories from Aussie writers who should’ve known better, 2005
 "Running", Daikaiju Anthology, 2005
 "Hooked", Borderlands Issue 5, 2005
 "M’Boy Cain", Ticonderoga Online Issue 3, 2005
 "I, Assassin", Shadowed Realms Issue 2, Nov/Dev 2004
 "Armageddon for Dummies", Antipodean SF Issue 75, 2004
 "Maelstrom", Agog! Smashing Stories, 2004
 "Tangled", Andromeda Spaceways Inflight Magazine issue 11, 2004
 "Wood Whispers", Fables and Reflections 6, 2004
 "The Art of Suffering", Ticonderoga Online, 2003
 "Know-It-All", Antipodean SF Issue 67, 2003
 "Mrs Mary Unicorn", Borderlands: Trilogies convention book, 2003
 "House Call", Antipodean SF Issue 62, 2003
 "Sigmund Freud and the Feral Freeway", Agog! Terrific Tales, 2003
 "The Proverbial", Fables and Reflections 4, 2003
 "The Last Dolphin", Fables and Reflections 4, 2003
 "The Last Laugh", Borderlands: That Which Scares Us convention book, 2002
 "Into the Valley", Borderlands: That Which Scares Us convention book (winner of short story competition), 2002
 "Halo", AustrAlien Absurdities, 2002
 "Quicksilver", Mitch? Hacks to the Max, 2002
 "Alternator", Mitch? Tarts of the New Millennium, 2001
 "Sweetheart", Antipodean SF issue 35, 2001
 "Wrevelation", Mitch? Short Stories for Short Attention Spans, 2000
 "Hunters", published on the Ticonderoga web site, 1999
 "Living With the Dead", Eidolon issue 16, 1995
 "Ghost Card", Eidolon issue 10, 1992
 "Shifter", Aurealis issue 9, 1992

Awards

 Honorable Mention, Ellen Datlow's Year's Best Horror, 2012, "Birthday Suit", Living With the Dead, 2013
 Australian Shadows winner for Best Short Fiction, 2012, "Birthday Suit", Living With the Dead, 2013
 Australian Shadows finalist for Best Collection, 2012, N/A, Living With the Dead, 2013
 Aurealis Award nomination for Best Collection, 2012, N/A, Living With the Dead, 2013
 Tin Duck nomination for Best WA Professional Short Written Work, 2012, "Birthday Suit", Living With the Dead, 2013
 Tin Duck winner for Best WA Professional Short Written Work, 2011, "The Last Gig of Jimmy Rucker" (co-written with Talie Helene), More Scary Kisses, 2012
 Honorable Mention, Best Horror of the Year Volume One, 2008, "Piggies", Midnight Echo Issue 1, 2008
 Listed in Recommended Reading List, Horrorscope Editorial: Dark Fiction in 2008, "Skinsongs", 2012, 2008
 Listed in Recommended Reading List, Years Best Fantasy and Horror volume 21, 2008, "There Was Darkness", Fantastic Wonder Stories, 2007
 Nominated for Tin Duck, Best Short Work, 2008, "There Was Darkness", Fantastic Wonder Stories, 2007
 Nominated for Australian Shadows Award, 2008, "There Was Darkness", Fantastic Wonder Stories, 2007
 Listed in Recommended Reading List, Years Best Fantasy and Horror volume 20, 2007, "Mine", The Outcast, 2006
 Nominated for Ditmar award, Best Novel, Carnies, Lothian Books, 2006
 Tin Duck award, Best WA Professional Long Work 2007, Carnies, Lothian Books, 2006
 Runner-Up for Tin Duck award, Best WA Professional Short Work 2007, "Dwar7es", Ticonderoga Online, 38961
 Shortlisted for Aurealis Awards, Best Horror Novel, Carnies, Lothian Books, 2006
 Nominated for the AntiSF Awards 2004, "Know-It-All", Antipodean SF Issue 67, 2004
 The Year's Best Australian SF & Fantasy One, Recommended Reading List, "Wood Whispers", Fables and Reflections 6, 2004
 The Year's Best Australian SF & Fantasy One, Recommended Reading List, "The Art of Suffering", Ticonderoga Online, 38047
 The Year's Best Australian SF & Fantasy One, Recommended Reading List, "Armageddon For Dummies", Antipodean SF Issue 75, 38200
 Highly Commended Notice in KSP SF Awards, "Deadline", N/A, 2005
 Listed in Recommended Reading List, Years Best Fantasy and Horror volume 18, 2005, "Maelstrom", Agog! Smashing Stories, 2004
 Chronopolis Short Story competition 2003, "Killing Time", N/A, 2003
 Shortlisted for Aurealis Awards, Best SF Short Story, "Sigmund Freud and the Feral Freeway", Agog! Terrific Tales, 2003
 Shortlisted for Ditmar Awards, Best Novella, "Sigmund Freud and the Feral Freeway", Agog! Terrific Tales, 2003
 Shortlisted for Tin Duck Awards, Best Short Story, "Sigmund Freud and the Feral Freeway", Agog! Terrific Tales, 2003
 Borderlands: That Which Scares Us short story competition winner, "Into the Valley", Borderlands: That Which Scares Us convention book, 2002
 Winner, Tin Duck Award, Best Short Story, "Living with the Dead", Eidolon issue 16, 1995
 Listed in Recommended Reading List, Years Best Fantasy and Horror 1993, "Ghost Card", Eidolon issue 10, 1992

References
 Aurealis Awards winners archive Retrieved 17 February 2008.
 Australian Horror Writers Association member page: Martin Livings
 Cummings, Shane Jiraiya. "Interview: Martin Livings". HorrorScope. 5 June 2006.
 Farr, Russell B. "A Much Bigger Story". Ticonderoga Online #8. 2006
 Inkspillers Ditmar Awards archive. Retrieved 17 February 2008.
 Kemble, Gary. "Q&A: An Australian werewolf (lover) in London" Article (ABC Online). 8 June 2006.
 "Livings the dream". Eastern Reporter newspaper. 20 June 2006

External links
 Martin Livings MySpace
 Two reviews of Carnies in Australian Specific in focus
 Review of Carnies in HorrorScope

Australian horror writers
Australian male short story writers
Australian science fiction writers
Australian fantasy writers
Living people
Writers from Perth, Western Australia
1970 births